Timothy James Ellis SC is a Tasmanian barrister and former Tasmanian Director of Public Prosecutions.

Background

Ellis was born in 1955 and raised in Longford, Tasmania. He graduated LLB from the University of Tasmania in 1977. He was admitted as a barrister and solicitor of the Supreme Court of Tasmania in 1979, and practised from the Launceston firm of Clarke & Gee.

He was appointed Director of Public Prosecutions in 1999, and was dismissed in 2015 following his conviction for negligent driving causing the death of Natalia Pearn in 2013.

Notable cases

In 2007, Ellis charged then Labor Minister for Infrastructure, Bryan Green, with conspiracy and interfering with an executive officer. The charges related to an alleged deal between Green and the Tasmanian Compliance Corporation, a privately-owned building accreditation company with two former Labor ministers on its board, which saw a monopoly granted to the Corporation for builder accreditation worth up to $2,600,000. Green was tried twice, on each occasion with a hung jury as a result. He was discharged by the Supreme Court.

In 2008, Ellis controversially decided to charge Jack Johnston, Commissioner of Tasmania Police with divulging State Secrets, igniting a political stoush with Premier David Bartlett. After Johnston successfully applied to stay the prosecution permanently, Ellis sought to appeal against the permanent stay first before the Court of Criminal Appeal, and then before the High Court of Australia by way of a special leave application, unsuccessfully in both cases.

Ellis was later criticised by Duncan Kerr, Member of the House of Representatives, in Federal Parliament for both the prosecution of Bryan Green and Jack Johnston. Kerr said:

In 2010, Ellis conducted the trial of Susan Neill-Fraser for the murder of Bob Chappell on Australia Day, 2009. The result was that Neill-Fraser was found guilty of murder, and sentenced to  26 years’ imprisonment with a non-parole period of 18 years. Ellis later defended the verdict and sentence before the Court of Criminal Appeal, with the result that the verdict was undisturbed, but the sentence was reduced to 23 years' imprisonment, with a non-parole period of 13 years. Ellis again successfully defended the verdict before the High Court of Australia on a special leave application.

Ellis was the subject of personal litigation against him and his former partners of the firm of Clarke & Gee, by a former client who alleged that one of the partners had given negligent advice in relation to the Launceston Tudor Motor Inn.

Criminal charge, appeal, and dismissal

On 24 March 2013, Ellis was driving south on the Midlands Highway in Tasmania around a sweeping bend when his vehicle crossed into a lan of oncoming traffic. Ellis managed to steer his vehicle in the wrong lane for some 30 seconds, over 700 metres. He collided with a vehicle being driven by Natalia Pearn. Ms Pearn died as a result of the crash.

Ellis was charged with negligent driving causing death, and pleaded not guilty. Describing the crash in her evidence, Ellis’ partner, Anita Smith, told the court:

Ellis was found guilty of negligent driving causing death on 26 June 2014. Following an unsuccessful appeal, Ellis returned to the Magistrates Court of Tasmania for sentencing. He was convicted of negligent driving causing death, and sentenced to 4 months’ imprisonment, wholly suspended, and driving disqualification for 24 months.

On 15 January 2015, Premier of Tasmania Will Hodgman and Attorney-General Vanessa Goodwin announced Ellis would not continue in the role of DPP, after the Governor accepted their recommendation he be removed from the position.

Ellis was the subject of criticism from the family of Natalia Pearn:

Later practice

Following his conviction and dismissal as DPP, Ellis was able to return to practice at the bar, with the Law Society of Tasmania President Matthew Verney responding to questions over whether his conviction indicated that by his character he was not fit to practise law, “He was convicted of negligence, not an intentional act, and Magistrate Webster was really clear in his decision in that regard that Ellis hadn't committed a deliberate act, like overtaking when it's unsafe or anything like that. So it's an act of negligence and by definition that is something that is distinct from a question of character."

Mr Ellis suggested the “structure” of Tasmania’s Court of Criminal Appeal “invites apprehension” from convicted criminals seeking to appeal their sentences.

References

1955 births
Living people
Tasmanian lawyers
University of Tasmania alumni
Australian prosecutors